The Northern Ireland Open is a professional ranking snooker tournament held in Belfast as part of the four-event Home Nations Series. The players compete for the Alex Higgins Trophy, named for the late two-time world champion who was born and raised in Belfast.

The reigning champion is Northern Ireland's Mark Allen, retaining his 2021 title. The record for most titles is three, won between 2018 and 2020 by Judd Trump.

History
On April 29, 2015, World Snooker chairman Barry Hearn announced that the "Northern Ireland Open" at a Belfast venue would be added to the main tour in 2016, as part of a new Home Nations Series with the existing Welsh Open and Scottish Open, and the new English Open tournaments.

In 2017, Yan Bingtao became the youngest player to reach a ranking final. Yan came close to breaking Ronnie O'Sullivan's record of being the youngest player to win a ranking event, which had stood for 24 years, but he narrowly lost to Mark Williams 8–9 after having led 8–7. This final also featured one of the biggest age gaps between finalists as Williams was almost 25 years older than Yan. Additionally, Yan also became the first player born in the 2000s to reach the final of a ranking tournament.

In 2018, 2019 and 2020, Judd Trump defeated Ronnie O'Sullivan 9–7 in each final. The 2020 tournament was staged outside Northern Ireland, at the Marshall Arena in Milton Keynes, because of the impact of the COVID-19 pandemic in the United Kingdom on the 2020–21 snooker season.

In 2021, Mark Allen became the first Northern Irish player to win the event, knocking out defending champion Judd Trump in the quarter-finals, and beating John Higgins 9–8 in the final, after trailing 6–8.

In 2022, Allen successfully defended the title, coming from 1–4 down to beat Zhou Yuelong 9–4.

Winners

See also
Malta Cup
Irish Masters
Irish Professional Championship
Northern Ireland Trophy
2011 Alex Higgins International Trophy
Home Nations Series

References

External links
 Chris Turner's Snooker Archive: Major European Tournaments

 

2016 establishments in Northern Ireland
Snooker ranking tournaments
Snooker competitions in Northern Ireland
Recurring sporting events established in 2016